The Heim Peninsula is located on the southern coast of Ellesmere Island, a part of the Qikiqtaaluk Region of the Canadian territory of Nunavut. The Sydkap Fiord is to the west, and the Harbour Fiord is to the east.

References

Ellesmere Island
Peninsulas of Qikiqtaaluk Region